Serafime Yaiya Sandra Carola Siekas (born April 15, 1990) known as Yaiya, is a Swedish-Sámi entertainment artist, singer, songwriter, actor and film director living in Stockholm, Sweden. She started performing at the age of 6 and won different talent shows like Swedish Radio's national talent show 2008 with Sapphire Sky.

In 2007 a radio station in France released the album Générations 88.2, a collection of 15 CDs described as the best hits 1997-2007, featuring Yaiya's song I'ma Do It (Anyway ft. NewKid). The album also featured artists like Ciara, Timbaland, Brian McKnight, Snoop Dogg, Dr. Dre, D'Angelo, Nas and Swedish rapper Promoe.

Yaiya is related to the Norwegian Sámi singer Mari Boine, 6th cousin.

Acting

Yaiya made a guest appearance on Channel 5's (Sweden) hidden camera show Svärföräldrarna från helvetet as the ex-girlfriend Sandy. She was also the face and producer of an online talent show iDream and hosted Season 1, November 2010 - April 2011. In commercial video, she has been a main representative of the Carlsberg Group soft drink Festis.

Yaiya (as Yaiya Sacasios) headlined Cabaret Large A-Cup in Manhattan at the Metropolitan Room.

Film production
At the age of 14 Yaiya founded her company Ymperia and started to teach performance and film acting with her mother Carola Siekas Kostenius. 2012 they opened Ymperia Academy in Stockholm, Sweden and presented The Ymperian Method to their students.  Yaiya directed a lot of films and in 2015 she won Skellefteå Krafts Competition Brainpower with her 14 seconds short film What Makes The World Go 'Round?

2016 and 2017 Ymperia Academy won Artisternas Hatt for "the widest course offer for cultural workers".

Discography
Sapphire Sky (2007)
Ima Do It (Anyway) ft. Newkid - released in France on the album "Générations 88.2" (2007)
Lumumba - Lalcko ft. YAIYA - released in France on Lalcko's debut album (2008)
I Can't Help Making Music (2009)
Handcuffed Contract (2009)
My Window - J-Son ft. YAIYA (2009)
Pure Heart (2010)
Whiteboy - SHY ft. YAIYA (2011)
Juuret ft. Bengt Kostenius & Orlando Siekas (2016)
Jag går bredvid (2021)

References

External links

YAIYA

Living people
Swedish singer-songwriters
English-language singers from Sweden
Swedish actresses
1990 births
21st-century Swedish singers
21st-century Swedish women singers
21st-century guitarists
Swedish Sámi musicians
Swedish artists
21st-century women guitarists